Ringo is a 1978 American made-for-television comedy film starring Ringo Starr as both a fictionalised version of himself and his fictional half-brother "Ognir Rrats" (Ringo Starr spelled backwards). It was broadcast on the US NBC network on 26 April 1978.

The film features an all-star cast, including Art Carney, John Ritter, Carrie Fisher and George Harrison. Starr performs songs from his concurrent album, Bad Boy, and older material. The film's story is loosely based on The Prince and the Pauper.

The program finished 53rd of 65 network prime-time programs for the week.

References

External links

1978 television films
1978 films
1978 comedy films
American comedy films
Films about the Beatles
Ringo Starr
Television programmes about the Beatles
NBC network original films
Films about percussion and percussionists
Films based on The Prince and the Pauper
Television shows based on works by Mark Twain
1970s American films